is a Japanese actress, voice actress and idol. She is affiliated with the agency Amuleto. She is known for her involvement in Nitroplus' franchise Super Sonico.

Career
Yamamoto began her career as an idol in 2002. From 2005 to 2008, she was a member of the idol unit Pink Jam Princess, which she led. She had regular radio shows at Nippon Cultural Broadcasting beginning in January 2007. She made her voice acting debut in 2009, and signed to voice acting agency Mausu Promotion the following year, initially only for her voice acting career. She moved to Amuleto in 2014.

Filmography

Anime
2009
Nyan Koi! as Harumi (episode 11)

2010
Angel Beats! as Female student (episode 6), Yuri's sister (episode 12)

2011
Steins;Gate as Nae Tennōji
Honto ni Atta! Reibai-Sensei as Emma, Tont
Softenni as Girl A (episode 7)

2012
Nukko. as Nukko
Robotics;Notes as Nae Tennōji

2014
SoniAni: Super Sonico The Animation as Super Sonico
Dramatical Murder as Announcer
Hanayamata as Arisa Kajiwara
Robot Girls Z as General Brute's Manitou

2019
YU-NO: A Girl Who Chants Love at the Bound of this World as Marina

2022
Irodorimidori as Nazuna Tennozu

OVA
2010
Megane no Kanojo as Female student (episode 1); Female student A (episode 4); Maki (episode 3); Waitress (episode 2)

2013
Corpse Party: Tortured Souls as Naho Saenoki

2015
Senran Kagura: Estival Versus - Festival Eve Full of Swimsuits as Shiki

Games
2009
Item Getter: Bokura no Kagaku to Mahō no Kankei 
Kimo Kawa E as Popular announcer
Steins;Gate as Nae Tennōji
Soukū no Frontier as Arisa
Hakushaku to Yōsei
Hyakko as Kobato Yomo
Myself;Yourself: Sorezore no Finale as Sakuya MurayamaLucian Bee's Resurrection Supernova as Tapan

2010Corpse Party: Blood Covered Repeated Fear as Naho Saenoki

2011Wizardry Twinpack as TanyaQueen's Gate Spiral Chaos   Corpse Party: Book of Shadows as Naho SaenokiSteins;Gate: Darling of Loving Vows as Nae TennōjiHakuisei Renai Shoukougun as KohakuMeikyū no Cross Blade as Shizuna MinaseYakuza: Dead Souls as Kazumi

2012Corpse Party the Anthology: Sachiko's Game of Love - Hysteric Birthday 2U as Naho SaenokiStar + One! as Eris MashiroFire Emblem Awakening as SumiaRobotics;Notes as Nae Tennōji

2013Kaihō Shōjo SIN as OlgaSenran Kagura Shinovi Versus as ShikiMeikyū no Cross Blade Infinity as Shizuna Minase

2014Corpse Party: Blood Drive as Naho SaenokiDekamori Senran Kagura as ShikiTokyo 7th Sisters as Yumeno SakaiyaRensa Hannō as Akane Ayazaki

2015Irodori Midori as Nazuna TennōsuValkyrie Drive: Bhikkhuni as Mankupumaru-chanCorpse Party: Blood Covered Repeated Fear 3DS as Naho SaenokiSteins;Gate 0 as Nae TennōjiSettai Gaigeki Wars as Monari Senran Kagura: Estival Versus - Festival Eve Full of Swimsuits as ShikiMapleStory Black Heaven as Cygnus

2016YU-NO: A Girl Who Chants Love at the Bound of this World as Female guard

2017Cyberdimension Neptunia: 4 Goddesses Online as †Kuronekohime†

2022Anonymous;Code'' as Bambi Kurashina

References
General

Specific

External links
 
Official agency profile 

1986 births
Living people
Voice actresses from Tokyo
Japanese gravure models
Japanese television personalities
Japanese video game actresses
Japanese voice actresses
21st-century Japanese actresses
21st-century Japanese women singers
21st-century Japanese singers
Mausu Promotion voice actors